Aechmea ampla is a plant species in the genus Aechmea. It is endemic to the State of Bahia in Brazil.

References

ampla
Flora of Brazil
Plants described in 1972